Bad or BAD may refer to:

Common meanings
Evil, the opposite of moral good
Erroneous, inaccurate or incorrect
Unhealthy, or counter to well-being
Antagonist, the threat or obstacle of moral good

Acronyms
 BAD-2, a Soviet armored trolley car
 Bank account debits tax, an Australian tax
 Bcl-2-associated death promoter, a pro-apoptotic protein
 Team B.A.D., a professional wrestling tag team

Films
 Andy Warhol's Bad, a 1977 film
 Bad, an unfinished film by Theo van Gogh

Music

Performers
 B. A. D., the Taiwanese boy band, who formed in 1998
 Big Audio Dynamite, Mick Jones' post-Clash band, from London
 Royce da 5'9", the American rapper known as Bad, in the group Bad Meets Evil

Albums
 Bad (album), a 1987 album by Michael Jackson
 BAD, or Bigger and Deffer, the second album by LL Cool J, 1987

Songs
 "Bad" (U2 song), 1984
 "Bad" (Michael Jackson song), 1987
 "Bad", from the 2011 album Symphony Soldier by The Cab
 "Bad" (Wale song), 2013
 "Bad" (David Guetta and Showtek song), 2014
 "Bad!" (XXXTentacion song), 2018
 "Bad" (James Bay song), 2019
 "Bad", by Don Diablo, featuring Zak Abel, 2020

Other music
 Bad (tour), a Michael Jackson world tour

Places
 "Bad" is the German word for "bath/spa" and so is found in many placenames in German-speaking Europe, e.g. Bad Kissingen
 Bad, Azerbaijan, a village in the Quba District
 Bad, a village in the Agra district of India
 Bad, Uttar Pradesh, a census town in India
 Bād, alternate name for Badrud, a city in Iran
 Bad River (disambiguation), various rivers

Other uses
 Bad (economics), the opposite of a good
 Bad (cuneiform), a cuneiform sign
 Little Miss Bad, a character in the Little Miss series of books by Roger Hargreaves
 Banda languages, spoken in Central Africa (ISO 639-2 and -5 codes "bad")
 Barksdale Air Force Base, Bossier City, Louisiana, US (IATA airport code BAD)

See also
 BADD (disambiguation)
 List of people known as the Bad
 Bad 25, 2012 special 25th anniversary edition of the Michael Jackson album Bad
 Bad 25 (film), a 2012 documentary film about the Michael Jackson album